Hanning Elektro-Werke GmbH und Co. KG, (limited partnership with a limited liability company as general partner) a German family-owned company, was founded in 1947 by Robert Hanning and is part of the international production network. It employs around 1,500 people worldwide.

Company history 

The company was established in 1947 by Robert Hanning under the name ’Elektrobau Hanning GmbH’ in Lipperreihe near Bielefeld (Germany). In 1977 the company name was changed to ’HANNING ELEKTRO-WERKE GmbH & Co. KG’. Due to HANNINGs' stable and economic growth, the factory as well as the storage in Oerlinghausen was expanded in 1980. After the German reunification the company then established itself in 1992 in Eggesin, as the largest employer of the city. The HANNING production network, to which HANNING ELEKTRO-WERKE belongs, comprises around 1,500 employees at four locations in Germany (Oerlinghausen and Eggesin), Romania and India. In addition, there are sales partners on all continents.

Products

Products of the market division Industrial Applications 
Customized synchronous/asynchronous motor systems, electronically controlled drives, encapsulated synchronous/asynchronous drives, synchronous/asynchronous drives with housing, frameless drives, customized inverter systems, encapsulated frequency inverters, inverters with housing, frameless frequency inverters and more
Customized pump systems, electronically controlled pumps, encapsulated pumps, pumps with housed or frameless motors and more

Products of the market division Appliance Applications  
Customized pump systems, electronically controlled pumps, encapsulated pumps, pumps with housed or frameless motors, customized synchronous/asynchronous fan systems, electronically controlled fan drives, encapsulated synchronous/asynchronous fan drives, synchronous/asynchronous fan drives with housing, frameless fan drives and more

Products of the market division Linear Actuators  
Customized linear actuator systems, electronically controlled linear actuators, encapsulated linear actuators, linear actuators with housing, frameless linear actuators, lifting columns and more
Customized synchronous/asynchronous motor systems, electronically controlled drives, encapsulated synchronous/asynchronous drives, synchronous/asynchronous drives with housing, frameless drives and more

Certification 
 DIN EN ISO 9001 
 DIN EN ISO 14001

External links
 Website of the company (https://www.hanning-hew.com)

References

Manufacturing companies of Germany